Erik Brofoss (21 June 1908 – 7 May 1979) was a Norwegian economist and politician for the Labour Party.

Brofoss was born in Kongsberg. In his younger days he was an athlete who competed national level in the 100 metres. He represented Kongsberg IF, and won a silver medal at the Norwegian championships in 1928. His career best time in 100 m was 10.8 seconds, achieved in August 1931 in Kongsberg. He had 6.96 metres in the long jump, achieved in July 1928 at Bislett stadion.

He became Minister of Finance in 1945 and stayed in this position until 1947. He then helped found the Ministry of Trade and Shipping and headed it from 1947 to 1954.  He was later a director of the Executive Board of the International Monetary Fund from 1970 to 1973.

References

1908 births
1979 deaths
Ministers of Finance of Norway
Ministers of Trade and Shipping of Norway
Labour Party (Norway) politicians
Governors of the Central Bank of Norway
Norwegian male sprinters
Kongsberg IF
20th-century Norwegian economists
People from Kongsberg